Kashimura is a Japanese surname. Notable people with the surname include:

, Imperial Japanese Navy officer
, Japanese sprint canoeist

Japanese-language surnames